Liettres is a commune in the Pas-de-Calais department in the Hauts-de-France region of France.

Geography

Population

Places of interest
 The church of St. Pierre, dating from the sixteenth century.
 Remains of the fifteenth-century chateau, partly destroyed in 1542 by troops of the Duke de Vendôme.
 The seventeenth-century chateau.
 An ancient windmill.
 Sacré-Coeur chapel.

See also
Communes of the Pas-de-Calais department

References

Communes of Pas-de-Calais